You Deserved to Be Single or Huogai Ni Danshen is a 2010 Chinese film directed by Chinese female director Cai Xin who co-wrote the screenplay also. It stars Taiwanese actress Ruby Lin, Chinese actress Gao Fei, Taiwanese actor Mike He and Taiwanese-American actor David Wu. Special guest casts include China pop group "Shuimu Nianhua" member Luke(Lu Gengxu), Hong Kong actress Angie Chiu and so on. It received mixed reviews with critics focusing on their praise on actor Mike He and Ruby Lin.

Plot
The film centres around three contemporary urban couples who are involved in what has been described as a romantic Infernal Affairs-Esquire chess game.

A pair of brother and sister - Li Zheng (played by Mike He) and Li Ying (played by Gao Fei) one happened to be a love detective and the other a love expert, when affluent businessman Xiao Feng turns up, requesting the agency test the waters with his bride-to-be, pretty psychiatrist Fei. Li Ying is immediately overwhelmed, seeing Xiao Feng as a potential catch rather than a customer.

Cast
Ruby Lin ... Fei
Mike He ... Li Zhang
David Wu ... Xiao Feng
Gao Fei... Li Ying
A Dai ... Ying Zi
Zhang Chao ... Lu Chao
Angie Chiu
Wang Gang
He Jie
Huang Xiao Lei
Liu Yun
Tao Hong

Awards and nominations
China Movie Channel Media Awards
 Nominated: Best Actress (Ruby Lin)
 Nominated : Best Actor (Mike He)
 Nominated : Best director (Cai Xin)
 Nominated : Best film of the year

Featured songs
Theme song "爱不能停 (Ai Buneng Ting)" by Ruby Lin and Liu Qin

Trivia
Production Studio : Beijing Golden Harvest Entertainment Co. Ltd, Star Shining TV & Art Co. Ltd
Distributed by China Film (In China region)
Specially Sponsor by Hyundai Car Group (Korea)

Reception
"You Deserve To Be Single feels surprisingly human for all its glossy assembly-line vacuity. The four leads all seem genuinely invested in making the film convince; Ruby Lin especially is far better than the material deserves, turning in a quiet, assured performance as Fei that's immediately winning. Even Mike He (who struggles to impress under a makeover so glossy it looks as if he's been airbrushed) still manages to internalise a weary, rueful longing that makes their banter genuinely affecting…"—twitchfilm.com

References

External links

 Review at twitchfilm
 "You Deserved To Be Single" Sina Page

2010 films
2010s Mandarin-language films
Films set in Beijing
2010 romantic drama films
Chinese romantic drama films
Golden Harvest films